Andrei Vladimirovich Liforenko (born 20 June 1975) is a former Russian football player.

External links
 

1975 births
Footballers from Saint Petersburg
Living people
Russian footballers
FC Rubin Kazan players
FC Dynamo Saint Petersburg players
PFC CSKA Moscow players
Russian Premier League players
FC Moscow players
FC Shakhter Karagandy players
Russian expatriate footballers
Expatriate footballers in Kazakhstan
FC Mordovia Saransk players
Association football defenders
FC Lokomotiv Saint Petersburg players